Elina Svitolina was the defending champion from the last time the event was held at Pune in 2012, but chose not to participate this year.

Aryna Sabalenka won the title, defeating Dalila Jakupović in the final, 6–2, 6–3.

Seeds

Draw

Finals

Top half

Bottom half

Qualifying

Seeds

Qualifiers

Qualifying draw

First qualifier

Second qualifier

Third qualifier

Fourth qualifier

References
Main Draw
Qualifying Draw

Mumbai Open
2017 in Indian tennis